Kathryn Stuart, sometimes credited as Katherine Stuart or Kathryne Stuart, was an American screenwriter active during Hollywood's silent era.

Biography 
Stuart attended Columbia University before taking up a career as a journalist and publicity woman. She resided in New York while writing screenplays and worked for Famous Players-Lasky (and later Paramount Artcraft).

Selected filmography 

 Timothy's Quest (1922)
 Behind Masks (1921)
 Something Different (1920)
 After Six Days (1920)
 39 East (1920)
 Away Goes Prudence (1920)
 That Stolen Kiss (1920)
 Erstwhile Susan (1919)
 The Career of Katherine Bush (1919)
 His Bridal Night (1919)
 The Probation Wife (1919)
 The Unpardonable Sin (1919)
 Cheating Cheaters (1919)
 The Road Through the Dark (1918)
The Savage Woman (1918)

References 

American screenwriters
American women screenwriters
Columbia University alumni